Aneta Pochmanová (born 12 April 2001) is a Czech footballer who plays as a midfielder for Sparta Prague.

She is a member of the Czech national team. She made her debut for the national team on 18 September 2020 in a match against Poland.

Pochmanová was voted talent of the year at the 2020 Czech Footballer of the Year (women).

References

External links
 
 
 

2001 births
Living people
Czech women's footballers
Women's association football midfielders
AC Sparta Praha (women) players
Footballers from Prague
Czech Republic women's international footballers
Czech Women's First League players